The Regional Greenhouse Gas Initiative (RGGI, pronounced "Reggie") is the first mandatory market-based program to reduce greenhouse gas emissions by the United States. RGGI is a cooperative effort among the states of Connecticut, Delaware, Maine, Maryland, Massachusetts, New Hampshire, New Jersey, New York, Rhode Island, Vermont and Virginia to cap and reduce carbon dioxide (CO2) emissions from the power sector. RGGI compliance obligations apply to fossil-fueled power plants 25 megawatts (MW) and larger within the 11-state region. As of 2021, Pennsylvania is pending RGGI membership with an anticipated start in early 2022, and North Carolina is currently considering joining RGGI.

RGGI establishes a regional cap on the amount of CO2 pollution that power plants can emit by issuing a limited number of tradable CO2 allowances. Each allowance represents an authorization for a regulated power plant to emit one short ton of CO2. Individual CO2 budget trading programs in each RGGI state together create a regional market for CO2 allowances.

The RGGI states distribute over 90 percent of allowances through quarterly auctions. These allowance auctions generate proceeds, which participating states are able to invest in strategic energy and consumer benefit programs. Programs funded through RGGI have included energy efficiency, clean and renewable energy, greenhouse gas abatement, and direct bill assistance.

An initial milestone program's development occurred in 2005, when seven states signed a memorandum of understanding announcing an agreement to implement RGGI. The RGGI states then established individual CO2 budget trading programs, based on the RGGI Model Rule. The first pre-compliance RGGI auction took place in September 2008, and the program became effective on January 1, 2009. The RGGI program is currently in its fifth three-year compliance period, which began January 1, 2021.

Track record and benefits 
RGGI states have reduced their carbon emissions while still experiencing economic growth. Power sector carbon emissions in the RGGI states have declined by over 50% since the program began.  Media have reported on RGGI's success as a nationally relevant example showing that economic growth can coincide with pollution reductions. In a report on RGGI, the Congressional Research Service has also said that, "experiences in RGGI may be instructive for policymakers seeking to craft a national program."

While multiple factors contribute to emissions trends, a 2015 peer-reviewed study found that RGGI has contributed significantly to the decline in emissions in the nine-state region. Alternate factors considered by the study included state Renewable Portfolio Standard (RPS) programs, economic trends, and natural gas prices.

Other independent reports have analyzed RGGI's economic impact. For example, two reports by the Analysis Group studied RGGI's first and second three-year compliance periods. They found that the effects of RGGI's first three years are generating in $1.6 billion in net economic benefit and 16,000 job-years, and RGGI's second three years are generating $1.3 billion in net economic benefit and 14,700 job-years. These figures do not include co-benefits such as public health improvements or avoided climate change impacts.

A Clean Air Task Force (CATF) study investigated public health benefits arising from the RGGI states' shift to cleaner power generation. The study found that the RGGI states transition to cleaner energy is saving hundreds of lives, preventing thousands of asthma attacks and reducing medical impacts and expenses by billions of dollars.

Projected Benefits of RGGI in Pennsylvania

Environmental 
RGGI has the potential to lower Pennsylvania's emissions of many pollutants dramatically.

 Carbon pollution would be reduced between 97 and 227 million tons
 Nitrogen Oxide would be reduced about 112,000 tons
 Sulfur Dioxide pollution would be reduced 67,000 tons

Health 
The reduction in state air pollution can potentially result in significant health benefits through 2030.

 639 fewer premature deaths
 30,000 fewer respiratory-related hospital visits

Economic 
The adoption of RGGI also has the potential to provide economic benefits through an increase in jobs, personal income, and $2 billion in gross state product through 2030.

RGGI Market 
The highs and lows of the RGGI market can be largely attributed to declining emissions and allowance oversupply, price controls, policy intervention, and the Clean Power Plan of 2015 by the Obama Administration. RGGI has faced its fair share of obstacles, like any other emissions trading program; one of these is an oversupplied market. The oversupplied market related to RGGI can be traced back to the transition from coal to natural gas as well as a weak economy during the time of implementation. Because RGGI has a low price floor, there is no scarcity of allowances. In the world of carbon offset credits, allowances are shared through a cap-and-trade system to limit harmful emissions and catalyze pollution cuts. This cap-and-trade system is proving successful globally as countries are allowed to set more ambitious climate goals and countries across the world are seeing downward trends in emissions.

Key Trends 
RGGI states have witnessed positive economic activity and a decrease in emissions, electricity prices, and coal generation. According to RGGI's 2018 Electricity Monitoring report, carbon dioxide emissions decreased by 48.3 percent between the 2006 to 2008 period and the 2016 to 2018 period. Electricity generation from coal decreased significantly since the inception of RGGI, while natural gas and renewable generation increased. RGGI also induces a downward pressure on wholesale electricity prices through investments in state-level energy efficiency programs. These programs, along with other associated RGGI measures, have helped provide positive economic impacts in the RGGI region—the RGGI program provided $1.4 billion in net positive economic activity between 2015 and 2017.

RGGI caps 
The RGGI CO2 cap is the regional cap on power sector emissions. The RGGI states included two interim adjustments to the RGGI cap to account for banked CO2 allowances. The cap declined 2.5 percent each year until 2020. Initial reductions were planned as follows:

The RGGI caps and adjusted caps decreased annually from 2014 to 2020, except in 2020 given the addition of New Jersey.

In 2017, the participating states agreed to further reductions in the regional cap, specifying a 30 percent reduction from 2020 to 2030. The new caps for 2021-2030 are as follows:

The RGGI states also established a Cost Containment Reserve (CCR) of CO2 allowances that creates a fixed additional supply of CO2 allowances that are only available for sale if CO2 allowance prices exceed certain price levels—$13.00 in 2021. In contrast to the CCR, there is an Emissions Containment Reserve (ECR), which serves as the floor and triggers a reduction in allowances if prices drop below the trigger price—$6.00 in 2021. The inclusion of the CCR and ECR ensures emission reduction costs are reasonable.

Compliance 
RGGI compliance obligations apply to fossil-fueled power plants 25MW and larger within the RGGI region. As of 2021, there were 203 such covered sources.

Under RGGI, sources are required to possess CO2 allowances equal to their CO2 emissions over a three-year control period. A CO2 allowance represents a limited authorization to emit one ton of CO2. The first three-year control period took effect on January 1, 2009, and extended through December 31, 2011. The second three-year control period took effect on January 1, 2012, and extended through December 31, 2014. The third three-year control period took effect on January 1, 2015, and extended through December 31, 2017. The fourth three-year control period took effect on January 1, 2018, and extended through December 31, 2020. The fifth three-year control period took effect on January 1, 2021, and extends through December 31, 2023.

As of April 2021, 97.5 percent of regulated power plants had met their compliance obligations for the fourth control period.

Quarterly regional auctions 

The first pre-compliance auction of RGGI CO2 allowances took place in September 2008. Regional auctions are held on a quarterly basis and are conducted using a sealed-bid, uniform price format. Since 2008, the RGGI states have held 54 auctions generating over $4.7 billion in proceeds. Auction clearing prices have ranged from $1.86 to $13.

Any party can participate in the RGGI CO2 allowance auctions, provided they meet qualification requirements, including provision of financial security. Auction rules limit the  number of CO2 allowances that associated entities may purchase in a single auction to 25 percent of the CO2 allowances offered for sale in that auction.

The RGGI auctions are monitored by an independent market monitor, Potomac Economics. Potomac Economics monitors the RGGI allowance market in order to protect and foster competition, as well as to increase the confidence of participants and the public in the allowance market. The independent market monitor has found no evidence of anti-competitive conduct, and no material concerns regarding the auction process, barriers to participation in the auctions, competitiveness of the auction results, or the competitiveness of the secondary market for RGGI CO2 allowances.

Market participants can also obtain CO2 allowances in secondary markets, such as the Intercontinental Exchange (ICE), or in over-the-counter transactions. The independent market monitor provides quarterly reports on the secondary market for RGGI allowances.

Investment of auction proceeds 
The RGGI states have discretion over how they invest RGGI auction proceeds. They have reinvested proceeds, generated by RGGI auctions in a wide variety of programs. Programs funded through RGGI investment in energy efficiency, renewable energy, direct bill assistance, and greenhouse gas abatement have benefited more than 3.7 million participating households and 17,800 participating businesses. These investments have saved participants money on their energy bills, created jobs, and reduced pollution.

Energy efficiency represents a large portion of RGGI investments. Ultimately, all electricity consumers, not only those who make upgrades, benefit from energy efficiency programs. For example, investing in efficiency programs - such as weatherizing houses - reduces the amount of electricity used. The decrease in electricity demand actually reduces the overall price of electricity. That means the costs go down for everyone, not just someone who installed new, efficient windows.

Program review 
The RGGI participating states have committed to comprehensive, periodic program reviews to consider program successes, impacts, and design elements. The RGGI states are currently undergoing a 2021 Program Review, which includes technical analyses and regularly scheduled public stakeholder meetings to solicit input. The 2021 Review is expected to be completed in early 2023.

The 2012 and 2016 RGGI Program Reviews completed in 2013 and 2017 resulted in several updates to the program. The 2012 Review led to a 45 percent reduction in the RGGI cap and the introduction of the CCR. The CCR and the reduced cap took effect in 2014. The 2016 Review established the ECR and an additional 30 percent reduction in the RGGI cap from 2020 to 2030. This review also included modifications to the CCR, offset categories, and the minimum reserve price.

History 

On December 20, 2005, seven governors from Connecticut, Delaware, Maine, New Hampshire, New Jersey, New York, and Vermont signed a memorandum of understanding aimed at developing a cap-and-trade program for power sector CO2 emissions in the northeastern and mid-Atlantic region. The MOU established the initial framework for RGGI.

The following year, in 2006, the same seven states amended the MOU and published the first Model Rule draft to guide individual state-level regulations. In 2007, Massachusetts, Maryland, and Rhode Island also signed on to the MOU. On December 31, 2008, the 10 MOU states finalized the first Model Rule, setting individual shares of the regional CO2 cap.

RGGI's first compliance period began on January 1, 2009, and the first Model Rule served as the regulatory framework for each participating state until 2013. During this time, New Jersey withdrew from the MOU. Groups such as Acadia Center had reported on lost revenue resulting from New Jersey's departure, and argued for renewed participation. After the election of governor Phil Murphy in 2017, New Jersey began to make preliminary moves to rejoin RGGI. New Jersey reentered the RGGI under an executive order on January 29, 2018. Updated Model Rules were released in 2013 and 2017.

After the 2017 election of Governor Ralph Northam in Virginia, the state began to make preliminary moves to join RGGI. However, the move was stopped in 2019 when the Republican-controlled state legislature wrote a provision in the budget bill prohibiting the state from joining RGGI. The move to join RGGI was re-introduced as part of the 2020 General Assembly. With a Democratic majority in both the House of Delegates and the General Assembly, the measure passed and was signed into law. Virginia effectively joined RGGI on January 1, 2021.

In October 2019, Pennsylvania Governor Tom Wolf ordered his administration to start working on regulations to bring Pennsylvania into RGGI. In 2021, Pennsylvania's Environmental Quality Board adopted the rulemaking of the CO2 Budget Trading Program, otherwise known as RGGI. It is expected that Pennsylvania will officially join RGGI in early 2022.

RGGI Legislation – Pennsylvania

Overview 
In September 2020, Governor Wolf vetoed a bill (H.B. 2025) that would restrict his administration's ability to take part in RGGI without the input of state lawmakers. Wolf vetoed the bill because he believes that the imminent effects of climate change outweighs other issues. Wolf's decision was heavily influenced by the economic and environmental benefits of other RGGI states. On July 13, 2021, Pennsylvania's Environmental Quality Board voted in favor (15–4) of adopting the CO2 Budget Trading Program. On September 1, 2021, the Independent Regulatory Review Commission, which evaluates whether proposed rules align with public interest, approved the final state rulemaking. In November, the Office of the Attorney General also approved the final rulemaking for "form and legality."

Legislation Opposing RGGI 
A number of bills relating to the opposition of RGGI in Pennsylvania were introduced in the 2021–2022 legislative session. H.B. 637, and its Senate counterpart, S.B. 119, attempts to prohibit the Pennsylvania Department of Environmental Protection (DEP) from taking actions surrounding carbon pricing programs, including RGGI, without legislative approval. As of January 2022, the two bills have yet to make it to Governor Wolf's desk. Another piece of legislation, the Senate Concurrent Regulatory Review Resolution 1, aims to prevent Pennsylvania from joining RGGI. Governor Wolf vetoed the resolution on January 10, 2022, however, the Senate Republican Caucus has indicated that it plans to override the veto.

RGGI Companion Bills 
In response to and in tandem with opposing legislation, two companion bills were introduced in the 2021–2022 legislative session, detailing the appropriation of RGGI auction proceeds to areas of need. S.B. 15 and H.B. 1565 have been proposed with Governor Wolf's support. As of January 2022, the bills have yet to pass their respective committees.

See also 

 Climate Stewardship Bill
 The Climate Registry
 Western Regional Climate Action Initiative
 Midwestern Greenhouse Gas Reduction Accord
 Climate Change Action Plan 2001
 List of climate change initiatives
 Regulation of greenhouse gases under the Clean Air Act

References

External links 
 
 New England Governors/Eastern Canadian Premiers Climate Change Action Plan
 International Carbon Action Partnership
 The Climate Registry

Greenhouse gas emissions in the United States
Emissions trading
United States interstate compacts
Carbon finance